Nana Patekar (born 1 January 1951) is an actor, writer, and film maker, mainly working in Hindi and Marathi cinema.

As an actor, he is best known for his role in the film Agni Sakshi, for which he won the National Film Award for Best Supporting Actor. He won another National Film Award for Best Supporting Actor, and the Filmfare Award for Best Supporting Actor, for his role in Parinda (1989). He then won the Filmfare Best Villain Award for his role in Angaar (1992). In 1995, he won the National Film Award for Best Actor as well as the Filmfare and the Screen awards for Best Actor for his role in Krantiveer (1994). He also won his second Filmfare Best Villain Award for his role in Apaharan (2005). In 2017 he won the Filmfare Marathi award for best actor for his performance in Natsamrat.

After making his acting debut in Bollywood with the 1978 drama Gaman, Patekar acted in a few Marathi films and some Bollywood films. After these roles, he achieved his breakthrough starring as a gangster in Parinda (1989), for which he won the National Film Award and the Filmfare Award for Best Supporting Actor. Later, he acted in and made his directorial debut with Prahaar: The Final Attack (1994). Patekar subsequently starred in and received critical acclaim for his performance in several commercially successful films of the 1990s, including Raju Ban Gaya Gentleman (1992); Angaar (1992), for which he won the Filmfare Award for Best Villain; Tirangaa (1993); Krantiveer (1994), for which he won the National Film Award and the Filmfare Award for Best Actor; Agni Sakshi (1996), for which he won his second National Film Award for Best Supporting Actor; and Khamoshi: The Musical (1996). During the early 2000s, he received praise for his performances in Shakti: The Power (2002) and Apaharan (2005); the latter earned him a second Best Villain award at Filmfare. Patekar's highest-grossing film releases came when he played a gangster in the comedy Welcome 
(2007) and its sequel Welcome Back.
(2008) Bommalottam which is his is Tamil debut film (2015), and a politician in the political thriller Raajneeti (2010). In 2016, he starred in the Marathi film Natsamrat.

Films

As an actor

As a director

As a narrator

References

External links
 Nana Patekar filmography at IMDb

Indian filmographies
Male actor filmographies